The 1973 All-Ireland Senior Hurling Championship Final was the 86th All-Ireland Final and the culmination of the 1973 All-Ireland Senior Hurling Championship, an inter-county hurling tournament for the top teams in Ireland. The match was, held at Croke Park, Dublin, on 2 September 1973, between Limerick and Kilkenny. The Leinster champions lost to their Munster opponents on a score line of 1-21 to 1-14.

Background
This was Kilkenny's third consecutive appearance in an All-Ireland final. After losing to Tipperary in 1971, 'the Cats' defeated Cork to take their eighteenth championship title in 1972.  Limerick, having won the Munster title for the first time since 1955, were lining out in a first All-Ireland final since 1940 when they claimed their sixth championship crown.

The two teams last met in a major game in the semi-final of the 1971-1972 National Hurling League. Limerick were the winners on that occasion with a score line of 3-13 to 2-13.  Both teams last met in the championship in the 1940 All-Ireland final when Limerick won. The 1973 All-Ireland final was the sixth championship clash between the two. Limerick had three victories - the All-Ireland finals of 1897, 1936 and 1940 - while Kilkenny defeated Limerick in the finals of 1933 and 1935.

All-Ireland final

Overview
2nd of September was the date of the 1973 All-Ireland senior hurling final at Croke Park. Limerick were playing at Croke Park for the first time in eighteen years, while for Kilkenny Croke Park was regarded as a home away from home due to the frequency of their visits.

Limerick started the game as rank outsiders against a strong Kilkenny team; however, ‘the Cats’ suffered a streak of lost games. Between the Leinster and All-Ireland deciders Kilkenny lost many of their key players for one reason or another.  Éamonn Morrissey was forced to emigrate to Australia, Jim Treacy was ruled out due to injury, Kieran Purcell couldn’t play because of appendicitis and Eddie Keher couldn’t play because of a broken collar bone. Limerick saw their chance and made a masterful selectorial decision. With Keher and Purcell sidelined Pat Delaney would take up the mantle as Kilkenny’s chief scorer.  Delaney was an exceptional half-forward who was far too quick for most defenders.  Instead of using a defender to mark him the Limerick selectors moved Éamonn Cregan from the forwards back to centre-back where he was charged with the task of nullifying the Kilkenny marksman. Limerick also had serious losses that day. Mickey Graham, who broke his leg in the National League Final that year, was thus a spectator. Jim O'Donnell, was also injured and was man of the match in the first round v Clare that year and Mick O'Loughlin who would have been their first choice corner back, but could not commit himself to the cause that year were also out. Leonard Enright, who would subsequently win 3 All Stars in his early thirties was engaged in other sports in '73 and thus also unavailable.

The weather on the day of the final was wet, with heavy showers falling before and during the match.  Because of this the pitch was slippery while the sliotar was also difficult to control.

Match report
At 3:15pm Mick Slattery of Clare threw in the sliotar and the game was on.  The opening forty minutes saw Kilkenny set the standard.  Pat Delaney, in spite of Éamonn Cregan doing an excellent man-marking job, scored the opening goal of the game to give Kilkenny the lead.  Twice Limerick fell behind in the opening half and twice they fought back.  At one stage they trailed by 1-5 to 0-3, however, they held Kilkenny scoreless for two nine-minute spells in the first-half.  At the short whistle Limerick were very much on top and left the pitch leading by 0-12 to 1-7.

Five minutes after the restart Kilkenny levelled the scores courtesy of points by Claus Dunne and Liam ‘Chunky’ O’Brien.  A minute later Kilkenny went a point ahead when Limerick keeper Séamus Horgan saved from a palmed shot by Mick Crotty.  Although the attempt on goal was blocked, the sliotar flew over the bar for a Kilkenny point.  Shortly afterwards Richie Bennis had the sides level when he converted a free from forty yards out.  A minute later Limerick secured the match-winning score.  A puck-out from Kilkenny keeper Noel Skehan was quickly sent back in his direction by Liam O'Donoghue.  Skehan saved the shot but Mossie Dowling and Ned Rea were waiting for the rebound.  Dowling became the Limerick hero as he turned the sliotar past Skehan and into the net.  Although the match was far from over this was the vital score that gave Limerick the title.  The entire second-half saw Limerick show their supremacy.  Kilkenny were held scoreless for twenty-three minutes during the second-half while Limerick went on a point-scoring spree for the final quarter.  Midfield marshal Richie Bennis finished the game with ten points to his name as Limerick claimed their seventh All-Ireland crown with a 1-21 to 1-14 victory.

Match details

All-Ireland Senior Hurling Championship Final
All-Ireland Senior Hurling Championship Final, 1973
All-Ireland Senior Hurling Championship Final
All-Ireland Senior Hurling Championship Finals
Kilkenny GAA matches
Limerick GAA matches